Arjun Chakrabarty is an Indian television actor mainly working in the Bengali-language television industry based in Kolkata. He came to prominence playing the male protagonist "Gora" in the television serial Gaaner Oparey. and is now known for his portrayal as Abir in the Guptodhon franchise.

Early life
He is the younger son of actors Sabyasachi Chakrabarty and Mithu Chakrabarty. Arjun Chakrabarty attended Assembly of God Church School, Kolkata, and graduated from St. Xaviers College, Kolkata in Mass Communication and videography, after which he began acting. He is also known by the nickname "Rishi".

Career

His acting debut was in Gaaner Oparey, a TV serial produced by Ideas Creations, that aired on Star Jalsha from 28 June 2010 to 16 April 2011. Chakrabarty received numerous accolades and awards for his terrific portrayal of the lead role, Gora in his debut.

His debut film Bapi Bari Jaa was released on 7 December 2012 and he played the male lead, Bapi. It was also the silver screen debut of Mimi Chakraborty who he was partnered with in Gaaner Oparey.

Filmography

Films

Web series 
The Nightwatchman (2019)/Hoichoi
Bonyo Premer Golpo 2 (2019)/Hoichoi
Murder in the Hills (2021)/Hoichoi
Byomkesh, Season 7 (2021)/Hoichoi
Mukti (2022)/ZEE5
Mahabharat Murders (2022)/Hoichoi
Murder by the Sea (2022)/Hoichoi

Theatre
Ekhon Tokhon (2013)
Dudh Kheyeche Mao (2014)
Chite Gur (2016)

Television

Tollywood e Tarinikhuro in Satyajiter Priyo Goppo (2000)/DD Bangla 
Gaaner Oparey (2010-2011)/Star Jalsha
Byomkesh - Episodes: Shajarur Kanta (2015)/Colors Bangla
Jamai Raja (2017-2018)/Zee Bangla

Telefilm
Professional (2015)/Zee Bangla Cinema
Akash Choan (2016)/Zee Bangla Cinema
Shei Meyeta (2016)/Zee Bangla Cinema

Short Film
Devi (2015)
Flames (2017)
The Hungry Stones (2017)

Web Original Film
Satyameva Jayate (2019)/ZEE5

References

External links

Indian male film actors
Living people
Male actors from Kolkata
Male actors in Bengali cinema
St. Xavier's College, Kolkata alumni
University of Calcutta alumni
Film and Television Institute of India alumni
21st-century Indian male actors
1990 births
Bengali Hindus
Bengali male television actors